"Te Guste" is a song recorded by American singer Jennifer Lopez and Puerto Rican rapper and singer Bad Bunny. It was written by Lopez, Xavier Semper, Edgar Semper, Luian Malavé, Benito Antonio Martínez Ocasio, Edgar Andino, Noah Assad, Juan Frias, Héctor Ramos and Armando Lozano. "Te Guste" was released as a single on November 9, 2018.

Background and composition
Of working with Lopez, Bad Bunny revealed: "I barely said a word to her because I was so nervous. I felt the pressure", adding: "She's a total professional, a diva, a mega-star, not just in music but in the entertainment industry. You always learn from the greats, and J.Lo is one." The Fader called the track reggaeton and a "long-awaited" collaboration. According to Suzette Fernandez of Billboard, the song's lyrics feature an exchange "when a couple meet for the first time, like each other and are remembering that moment."

Critical reception
Mike Wass of Idolator was positive, writing: "The reggaetón banger is certainly catchy enough and that summery production is guaranteed to cure the winter blues." Jeff Benjamin of Forbes noted that the song "lets J.Lo hone in on [sic] her musical chameleon style and deliver on a trap-y cut, while Bad Bunny can shine in the sound that made him a star. Plus, with Bad's recent hot streak and his two aforementioned hits, this collaboration is mutually beneficial to both parties who want to further up their already impressive weight in the Latin-pop world and continuously prove their superstardom." NPR's Stefanie Fernández was receptive of the song, stating: "None of it feels like she's trying too hard; she has earned this [...] It would seem that if everything Bad Bunny has touched this year has turned to gold, JLo has the power to make it stay." Rolling Stone writer Brittany Spanos described "Te Guste" as a "trap-pop gamechanger" and a "rom-com of a duet".

Music video
The song's accompanying music video, directed by Mike Ho, was called "vacation-themed", "warm-toned and tropical" by Billboard. In the video, Lopez wears a yellow bikini, while Bad Bunny is shown wearing various colorful, patterned shirts.

Promotion
Lopez revealed she had collaborated with Bad Bunny in October 2018, and shared a trailer for the music video they shot together for the song in November.

Charts

Weekly charts

Year-end charts

References

2018 singles
2018 songs
Bad Bunny songs
Jennifer Lopez songs
Songs written by Jennifer Lopez
Songs written by Bad Bunny
Songs written by Edgar Semper
Songs written by Xavier Semper
Sony Music Latin singles